Chipp is an English surname. Notable people with the surname include:

 Annetta R. Chipp (1866-1961), American temperance leader and prison evangelist
 Don Chipp (1925–2006), Australian politician
 Herbert Chipp (1850–1903), English tennis player

English-language surnames